Grange Court railway station was a junction station on the South Wales Railway in Gloucestershire (on the present day Gloucester to Newport Line) where it met the Hereford, Ross and Gloucester Railway.

History
Opened on 1 June 1855 by the Hereford, Ross and Gloucester Railway the station was taken over by the Great Western Railway in 1862 and then passed on to the Western Region of British Railways on nationalisation in 1948. Despite a local campaign to save the station led by West Gloucestershire MP Charles Loughlin the station was closed after the last train on 31 October 1964.

Though the actual junction remains connected to the main line, the station has now been demolished.

Station layout
The station consisted of four platforms, two on the Hereford, Ross and Gloucester Railway and the other two on the Gloucester to Newport Line. There was a shelter on each platform and platform one (the up platform on the Hereford, Ross and Gloucester Railway) had a stone station building with a cafe and booking office etc. There was a footbridge across the station, signal box, sidings and a small goods yard.

References

Further reading

External links
 Grange Court on navigable 1946 O. S. map

Disused railway stations in Gloucestershire
Former Great Western Railway stations
Railway stations in Great Britain closed in 1964
Railway stations in Great Britain opened in 1855
Beeching closures in England
1855 establishments in England